Ismael Barragán Ruiz (born 6 February 1986 in Seville, Andalusia) is a Spanish footballer who plays for Recreativo de Huelva as a central defense.

References

External links

1986 births
Living people
Spanish footballers
Footballers from Seville
Association football defenders
Segunda División players
Segunda División B players
Tercera División players
Sevilla FC C players
Sevilla Atlético players
Getafe CF B players
RSD Alcalá players
CD Teruel footballers
CP Cacereño players
Xerez CD footballers
Arandina CF players
Extremadura UD footballers
Écija Balompié players
Austrian Football Bundesliga players
Kapfenberger SV players
Spanish expatriate footballers
Expatriate footballers in Austria
Spanish expatriate sportspeople in Austria